Gastrocotyle may refer to:
 Gastrocotyle (flatworm), a genus of flatworms in the family Gastrocotylidae
 Gastrocotyle (plant), a genus of plants in the family Boraginaceae